San Bernardo Tlamimilolpan is a village in located in the municipality of Tepetlaoxtoc in the state of Mexico, Mexico.

References

Populated places in the State of Mexico
Tepetlaoxtoc